Major Peter Stapleton Shaw OBE (6 July 1888 – 3 August 1953) was a British Conservative Party politician.

He was elected to the House of Commons at the general election in 1935, as Member of Parliament (MP) for Liverpool Wavertree.
He did not contest the 1945 general election.

References

External links 
 

1888 births
1953 deaths
Conservative Party (UK) MPs for English constituencies
UK MPs 1935–1945
Graduates of the Royal Military College, Sandhurst
2nd Dragoon Guards (Queen's Bays) officers
City of London Yeomanry (Rough Riders) officers
Royal Tank Regiment officers
British Army personnel of World War I
Officers of the Order of the British Empire